José Lins do Rego Cavalcanti (July 3, 1901 – September 12, 1957) was a Brazilian novelist most known for his semi-autobiographical "sugarcane cycle." These novels were the basis of films that had distribution in the English-speaking world. 

Cavalcanti was born in Pilar Paraíba. Along with Graciliano Ramos and Jorge Amado he stands as one of the greatest regionalist writers of Brazil According to Otto Maria Carpeaux, José Lins was "the last of the story tellers". His first novel, Menino de Engenho ("Boy from the plantation"), was published with difficulty, but soon it got praised by the critics. He died in Rio de Janeiro, aged 56.

Novels

Menino de Engenho (1932)
Doidinho (1933)
Bangüê (1934)
O Moleque Ricardo (1935)
Usina (1936)
Pureza (1937 English; "Purity")
Pedra bonita (1938)
Riacho doce (1939)
Água-mãe (1941)
Fogo morto (1943)
Eurídice (1947)
Cangaceiros (1953)
Histórias da velha Totonha (1936)
Gordos e magros (1942)
Poesia e vida (1945)
Homens, seres e coisas (1952)
A casa e o homem (1954)
Meus verdes anos (1956)
Presença do Nordeste na literatura brasileira (1957)
O vulcão e a fonte (1958)
Dias idos e vividos (1981, posthumously)
Mae de todos (1981, posthumously)

Films based on his Novels
Pureza, directed by Chianca de Garcia (1940).
Plantation Boy, directed by Valter Lima (1965), based on Menino de Engenho novel.
The Last Plantation, directed by Marcos Farias (1976), based on Fogo morto novel.

Translations
The "Academia Brasileira de Letras" points out that several Novels by José Lins do Rego have been translated internationally: Germany, Argentina, Spain, USA, France, England, Italy, Portugal, and Korea.

References

Further reading
 Braga-Pinto, César,"José Lins do Rego e as fronteiras da amizade: Doidinho". Revista Olho d'Água 4 (2 ) (on-line). São José do Rio Preto: 2012. p. 77-87.
 Braga-Pinto, César,“Ordem e tradição: a conversão regionalista de José Lins do Rego.” Revista  do Instituto de Estudos Brasileiros 52, Sept/March, 2011, p. 13-42. 
 Braga-Pinto, César,“Homem de Palavra, Homem de Letras: Literatura e Responsabilidade na Obra de José Lins do Rego”. Luso Brazilian Review 42 (1), 2006. 
 Braga-Pinto, César,“José Lins do Rego: sujeito aos ventos de Gilberto Freyre.” Revista de Critica Literaria Latinoamericana 59, 2004, p. 183-203.
 Braga-Pinto, César,13. “José Lins do Rego, o panfletário e o católico.” Introd. To Ligeiros Traços: escritos de juventude de José Lins do Rego. Rio de Janeiro: Editora José Olympio, 2007. 17-35

External links

Encyclopedia.com
 Site do Escritor, with bibliography and timeline of José Lins do Rego (in Portuguese)

People from Paraíba
Rego, Jose Lins do
Rego, Jose Lins do
20th-century Brazilian novelists
20th-century Brazilian male writers
Brazilian male novelists